Doris Maletzki (for some time Brachmann, born 11 June 1952 in Salzwedel) is a retired East German sprinter who specialised in the 200 metres.

She won a gold medal in 4 × 100 metres relay at the 1974 European Championships, together with teammates Christina Heinich, Bärbel Eckert and Renate Stecher. At the 1976 Summer Olympics in Montreal she won a gold medal in 4 × 400 metre relay, with her teammates Brigitte Rohde, 400 m silver medalist Christina Brehmer and 400 m bronze medalist Ellen Streidt. She competed for the club SC Dynamo Berlin during her active career. 

Maletzki served as managing director of football club BFC Dynamo in 2001. She was elected as the first woman to the presidium of the Berlin Football Association (BFV) in 2004. Maletzki serves as the vice chairman of the financial committee of BFV as of 2021. She is a representative of BFC Dynamo in the BFV.

References

1952 births
Living people
People from Salzwedel
East German female sprinters
Sportspeople from Saxony-Anhalt
Athletes (track and field) at the 1976 Summer Olympics
Olympic athletes of East Germany
Olympic gold medalists for East Germany
European Athletics Championships medalists
Medalists at the 1976 Summer Olympics
Olympic gold medalists in athletics (track and field)
Recipients of the Patriotic Order of Merit in silver
Olympic female sprinters
Universiade medalists in athletics (track and field)
Universiade bronze medalists for East Germany